English actress, singer, and director Julie Andrews has received several awards and award nominations for her work on both the screen and stage. Among them, she has won six Golden Globe Awards, two Emmy Awards, two British Academy Film Awards, three Grammy Awards, and one Academy Award. In 1979, Andrews received a Star on the Hollywood Walk of Fame. She was made a Disney Legend in 1991 for her work on Mary Poppins. She received the Lifetime Achievement Award from the Screen Actors Guild Awards in 2007. She has also received Accolades from the New York Film Critics Circle Awards, Laurel Awards, People's Choice Awards, Nickelodeon Kids' Choice Awards, and Helpmann Awards.

Major associations

Academy Awards

British Academy Film Awards

Golden Globe Awards

Grammy Awards

Emmy Award 
{| class=wikitable
|-
! scope="col" style="width:5em;" | Year
! scope="col" style="width:26em;"| Category
! scope="col" style="width:25em;"| Nominated work
! scope="col" style="width:5em;" | Result
|-
! colspan="4" |Daytime Emmy Award
|-
| style="text-align:center;"|1981
|Outstanding Performer in Children's Programming
|The CBS Festival of Lively Arts for Young People|The CBS Festival of Lively Arts for Young People
|
|-
| style="text-align:center;", rowspan="2" |2017
|Outstanding Writing in a Children's Program
| rowspan="2" |Julie's Greenroom
|
|-
|Outstanding Preschool Children's Series
|
|-
! colspan="4" |Primetime Emmy Award
|-
| style="text-align:center;"|1958
|Actress – Best Single Performance – Lead or Support
|Cinderella
|
|-
| style="text-align:center;"|1965
|Outstanding Individual Achievements in Entertainment 
|The Andy Williams Show
|
|-
| style="text-align:center;"|1972
|Outstanding Variety Special
|Julie and Carol at Lincoln Center|Julie and Carol at Lincoln Center
|
|-
| style="text-align:center;", rowspan="2" |1973
|Outstanding New Series
| rowspan="2" |The Julie Andrews Hour
|
|-
|Outstanding Variety Musical Series
|
|-
| style="text-align:center;"|1995
|Outstanding Performance in a Variety or Music Program
|The Sound of Julie Andrews|The Sound of Julie Andrews
|
|-
| style="text-align:center;"|2004
|Outstanding Supporting Actress in a Miniseries or a Movie
|Eloise at Christmastime
|
|-
| style="text-align:center;"|2005
|Outstanding Nonfiction Series
|Broadway: The American Musical|Broadway: The American Musical
|
|-
| style="text-align:center;"|2021
|rowspan=2|Outstanding Character Voice-Over Performance
|Bridgerton: Diamond of the First Water
|
|-
| style="text-align:center;"|2022
|Bridgerton: Capital R Rake 
|
|-
|}

 Tony Awards 

 † Andrews declined the nomination for her role in Victor/Victoria'', citing that she felt that the rest of the company had been overlooked.

Screen Actors Guild Awards

Drama Desk Awards

Honorary awards

AFI Life Achievement Award

Hollywood Walk of Fame

Kennedy Center Honors

Other awards

Honorary degrees 
Andrews has received many honorary degrees in recognition of her distinguished career in entertainment. These include:
 1970: University of Maryland – Doctor of Fine Arts
 1999: Yale University – Doctor of Fine Arts
 2012: Stony Brook University – Doctor of Letters

References 

Andrews, Julie